Jumas Omar (born Jumas Omar, 10 October 1943 - May 1989 in London) was a Zanzibar-born actor who appeared in several British films set in Africa as a child actor.

Filmography
 West of Zanzibar (1954)
 Safari (1955)
 Odongo (1956)
 Fury at Smugglers' Bay (1961)

References

External links

1943 births
1989 deaths
Tanzanian male film actors
20th-century male actors
Male child actors
African child actors